In number theory, a Wagstaff prime is a prime number of the form

where p is an odd prime. Wagstaff primes are named after the mathematician Samuel S. Wagstaff Jr.; the prime pages credit François Morain for naming them in a lecture at the Eurocrypt 1990 conference. Wagstaff primes appear in the New Mersenne conjecture and have applications in cryptography.

Examples 

The first three Wagstaff primes are 3, 11, and 43 because

Known Wagstaff primes 

The first few Wagstaff primes are:
3, 11, 43, 683, 2731, 43691, 174763, 2796203, 715827883, 2932031007403, 768614336404564651, … 

, known exponents which produce Wagstaff primes or probable primes are:
3, 5, 7, 11, 13, 17, 19, 23, 31, 43, 61, 79, 101, 127, 167, 191, 199, 313, 347, 701, 1709, 2617, 3539, 5807, 10501, 10691, 11279, 12391, 14479, 42737, 83339, 95369, 117239, 127031 (all known Wagstaff primes)
138937, 141079, 267017, 269987, 374321, 986191, 4031399, …, 13347311, 13372531, 15135397 (Wagstaff probable primes) 

In February 2010, Tony Reix discovered the Wagstaff probable prime:
 
which has 1,213,572 digits and was the 3rd biggest probable prime ever found at this date.

In September 2013, Ryan Propper announced the discovery of two additional Wagstaff probable primes:
 
and
 
Each is a probable prime with slightly more than 4 million decimal digits.  It is not currently known whether there are any exponents between 4031399 and 13347311 that produce Wagstaff probable primes.

In June 2021, Ryan Propper announced the discovery of the Wagstaff probable prime:
 
which is a probable prime with slightly more than 4.5 million decimal digits.

Primality testing 

Primality has been proven or disproven for the values of p up to 127031. Those with p > 127031are probable primes . The primality proof for p = 42737 was performed by François Morain in 2007 with a distributed ECPP implementation running on several networks of workstations for 743 GHz-days on an Opteron processor. It was the third largest primality proof by ECPP from its discovery until March 2009.

The Lucas–Lehmer–Riesel test can be used to identify Wagstaff PRPs. In particular, if p is an exponent of a Wagstaff prime, then
.

Generalizations 
It is natural to consider more generally numbers of the form

where the base . Since for  odd we have

these numbers are called "Wagstaff numbers base ", and sometimes considered a case of the repunit numbers with negative base .

However, when  does not admit an algebraic factorization, it is conjectured that an infinite number of  values make  prime, notice all  are odd primes.

For , the primes themselves have the following appearance: 9091, 909091, 909090909090909091, 909090909090909090909090909091, … , and these ns are: 5, 7, 19, 31, 53, 67, 293, 641, 2137, 3011, 268207, ... .

See Repunit#Repunit primes for the list of the generalized Wagstaff primes base . (Generalized Wagstaff primes base  are generalized repunit primes base  with odd )

The least primes p such that  is prime are (starts with n = 2, 0 if no such p exists)
3, 3, 3, 5, 3, 3, 0, 3, 5, 5, 5, 3, 7, 3, 3, 7, 3, 17, 5, 3, 3, 11, 7, 3, 11, 0, 3, 7, 139, 109, 0, 5, 3, 11, 31, 5, 5, 3, 53, 17, 3, 5, 7, 103, 7, 5, 5, 7, 1153, 3, 7, 21943, 7, 3, 37, 53, 3, 17, 3, 7, 11, 3, 0, 19, 7, 3, 757, 11, 3, 5, 3, ... 

The least bases b such that  is prime are (starts with n = 2)
2, 2, 2, 2, 2, 2, 2, 2, 7, 2, 16, 61, 2, 6, 10, 6, 2, 5, 46, 18, 2, 49, 16, 70, 2, 5, 6, 12, 92, 2, 48, 89, 30, 16, 147, 19, 19, 2, 16, 11, 289, 2, 12, 52, 2, 66, 9, 22, 5, 489, 69, 137, 16, 36, 96, 76, 117, 26, 3, ...

References

External links 

Chris Caldwell, The Top Twenty: Wagstaff at The Prime Pages.
 Renaud Lifchitz, "An efficient probable prime test for numbers of the form (2p + 1)/3".
 Tony Reix, "Three conjectures about primality testing for Mersenne, Wagstaff and Fermat numbers based on cycles of the Digraph under x2 − 2 modulo a prime".
List of repunits in base -50 to 50
List of Wagstaff primes base 2 to 160

Classes of prime numbers
Unsolved problems in number theory